Shankar Rao (1936/7 – 18 October 2021) was an Indian film and television actor who was known for his comic roles.

Life and career
Shankar began his acting career in theatre in Bengaluru. He founded his own theatre group known as Kalakshetra. He made his film debut with the movie ‘Yaara Sakshi’ (1972).

Selected filmography

Films
Yaara Sakshi (1972)
Muyyige Muyyi (1978)
Prachanda Kulla (1984) - Ganganna 
Jeevana Chakra (1985)
Elu Suttina Kote (1987)
Aasphota (1988)
Shruthi (1990)
Mysore Mallige (1992)
Ulta Palta (1997) - Shettru
Drona (2020) - Shankar

Television
Mayamruga (1998)
Silli Lalli (2003–2007)
Papa Pandu (2018–2020) - Boss Balaraju

References

External links

1930s births
Year of birth uncertain
2021 deaths
21st-century Indian actors
People from Tumkur